Jujumura  is a block under Sambalpur district of Odisha. This Block started functioning w.e.f. 03.10.1961. The Geographical area of this block is 660 sq kmshaving a total population of 83,072 as per 2011 Census. Out of which 12332 are SC and 41608 are ST and 29132 are others people. The percentage of SC and ST population comes to 14.84 and 50.09 respectively. There are 18 Nos. of GPs having 126 Nos. of Revenue villages out of which 6 nos. of villages are uninhabitated. The Block is coming under three Police Stations namely Jujomura, Sadar and Sason Police Station. The Block is coming under the 18-Rairakhol Assembly Constituency and 03-Sambalpur Parliamentary Constituency.

Transport 
Jujumura railway station is situated on Cuttack–Sambalpur line under the Sambalpur railway division of the East Coast Railway zone.

References

Sambalpur district